The AT&T Building is a high rise located at 240 North Meridian Street in Indianapolis, Indiana. It was opened in 1932 and is 22 stories tall. It is primarily used for office space and is the headquarters for AT&T in Indiana. The AT&T Building is connected to 220 Meridian (formerly known as the AT&T 220 Building), located directly south. The building has been expanded and has achieved its present form only after a few iterations.

Central Union Telephone Company building 

The Central Union Telephone Company built a headquarters building on the corner of Meridian and New York Streets in 1907. Indiana Bell bought Central Union in 1929, but found the existing headquarters inadequate. Originally, the old building was to be demolished to make way for a new building on the site. However, that would have caused disruptions in telephone service. Kurt Vonnegut Sr., the architect of the new building, suggested moving it to the adjacent lot at 13 West New York Street.

Completed on November 12 or 14, 1930, this was all done without interrupting customer telephone service or telephone business operations. Gas, heat, electric, water, and communication lines were modified before and during construction to add flexibility or length as needed.

The new headquarters was completed in 1932, and was seven stories tall. It was later expanded in the 1940s and 1960s to bring it to its current size and height. The original building that had been moved was demolished in 1963.

See also
List of tallest buildings in Indianapolis
List of tallest buildings in Indiana

References

External links

History of Indiana Bell

Skyscraper office buildings in Indianapolis
Telecommunications company headquarters in the United States
AT&T buildings
Office buildings completed in 1932
1932 establishments in Indiana